Malotte Creek is a stream in Greater Madawaska, Renfrew County in Eastern Ontario, Canada. It is in the Saint Lawrence River drainage basin and is a left tributary of Black Donald Creek.

Course
Malotte Creek begins at Malotte Lake and flows southwest. It gradually veers south, passes under Malotte Creek Road, and reaches its mouth at Black Donald Creek. Black Donald Creek flows via Black Donald Lake, the Madawaska River, and the Ottawa River to the Saint Lawrence River.

References

Rivers of Renfrew County